Aakash Gandhi is an Indian-American composer, pianist, songwriter, and entrepreneur who is currently based in Mumbai, India. He is widely known for his musical arrangements which blend piano and world elements to create largely instrumental and acoustic works. His YouTube channel, 88KeysToEuphoria, has amassed over 120 million views as of June 2020.

Early life and education
Aakash was born on May 22, 1985 in Orlando, Florida. From an early age he displayed an interest in music, learning to play his first tune on the piano at age 7. At the age of 8, he began taking private piano lessons where he was first introduced to western classical music, which he would continue to learn for the next ten years. Aakash grew up listening to the music of Bollywood. Throughout his teenage years, Aakash began performing at local cultural and community events in the Orlando area.

Aakash studied with honors and spent his high school years in the International Baccalaureate program. At the age of 18, he enrolled in the University of Central Florida to pursue a bachelor's degree in finance. Soon after, he attained his MBA in Finance from the same institution.

Music career

88KeysToEuphoria
Aakash gained his initial popularity through his YouTube channel, 88KeysToEuphoria, which he created in January 2008. He fast became noticed for his soulful piano and instrumental renditions, which he often performed live.

88 Keys To Euphoria soon became a collaborative powerhouse, where Aakash used the reach of his music to feature hidden musical talent around the world, beginning with flutist Sahil Khan in 2011 and vocalist Jonita Gandhi in 2012. Many of his music videos have gone viral on the web, reaching millions of views each. Amongst some of his most popular works are “Tujhe Bhula Diya on Piano,” “Pani Da Rang (Acoustic Cover),” “Tum Hi Ho (Acoustic cover),” and “Galliyan (Acoustic cover).”

Due to the growing popularity of his music, Aakash made the decision to shift to Mumbai in the fall of 2011 to pursue music full-time.

Aakash was also invited by Google to represent his channel, 88KeysToEuphoria, at the official YouTube FanFest in Mumbai on March 1, 2014.

Music videos
Aakash has released over 132 videos on YouTube via his channel. some of his recent videos, including “Tum Hi Ho (Acoustic Cover),” “Suhani Raat |Chaudhvin Ka Chand (Acoustic Cover),” and “Galliyan (Acoustic Cover),” have received critical and commercial acclaim for their musical and visual appeal.

Aakash made his debut onto YouTube on January 24, 2008 with a simple piano rendition of the song “Kal Ho Na Ho.” The video was shot with a tripod and handycam in his home in Florida. His videos featured shots of primarily his hands on the keyboard, which were recorded live in one-take. He continues to record his videos in one take.

In 2012 Aakash began investing his own money to produce professional music videos for his channel. He worked with director Devina Kanani to create videos intended to convey the mood in the music.

Collaborations

Online collaborations
Aakash has collaborated with numerous singers and musicians, featuring them in his music videos on 88 Keys To Euphoria. His most popular collaborations have been with vocalist Jonita Gandhi and flutist Sahil Khan, creating music that has since become popular. Aakash also featured singer Sanam Puri and guitarist Samar Puri, along with Jonita on his “Tum Hi Ho (Acoustic Cover) in May 2013. The popularity of the song caught the attention of music producer Clinton Cerejo, who roped in Sanam and Jonita for a duet in an episode of MTV's Coke Studios.

Sony Music collaboration
In May 2014, Aakash collaborated on a song with Sony Music to promote the worldwide release of Michael Jackson's 2014 album – Escape. Aakash also appeared in the music video released by Sony Music India.

Original composer
Aakash has plans to begin releasing his original compositions through his YouTube channel.

Music and film critic
From 2003 to 2009, Aakash served as Senior Writer and Managing Editor for the Bollywood web portal. He writes reviews of films and their soundtracks. In 2009 and 2010 he began freelancing as a writer for AVS TV Network. Aakash later credits his time as a music reviewer as a major factor for his interest and appreciation for music composition.

Entrepreneur – 88KeysToEuphoria.com
In 2011, Aakash founded 88KeysToEuphoria.com, where he personally teaches his students to play Bollywood songs on the piano through video tutorials. The website also serves as a portal where his followers can listen to his music as well as interact through community forums.

References

American male composers
21st-century American composers
Songwriters from Florida
Year of birth missing (living people)
Living people
American male pianists
21st-century American pianists
21st-century American male musicians
American male songwriters
American people of Indian descent
1985 births